866 Fatme (prov. designation:  or ) is a large background asteroid, approximately  in diameter, located in the outer region of the asteroid belt. It was discovered by German astronomer Max Wolf at the Heidelberg-Königstuhl State Observatory on 25 February 1917. The X-type asteroid has a short rotation period of 5.8 hours. It was named after "Fatme", a character in the opera Abu Hassan by Carl Maria von Weber (1786–1826).

Orbit and classification 

Fatme is a non-family asteroid of the main belt's background population when applying the hierarchical clustering method to its proper orbital elements. It orbits the Sun in the outer asteroid belt at a distance of 3.0–3.3 AU once every 5 years and 6 months (2,017 days; semi-major axis of 3.12 AU). Its orbit has an eccentricity of 0.05 and an inclination of 9° with respect to the ecliptic. The body's observation arc begins at Heidelberg Observatory on 16 March 1917, or three weeks after its official discovery observation.

Naming 

This minor planet was named after Fatme, a character in the opera Abu Hassan by German composer Carl Maria von Weber (1786–1826). The official  was also mentioned in The Names of the Minor Planets by Paul Herget in 1955. Another asteroid 865 Zubaida, was also named after a character of this opera. The composer himself was honored with the naming of 4152 Weber.

Physical characteristics 

In the Bus–Binzel SMASS classification, Fatme is an X-type asteroid.

Rotation period 

In June 2018, a rotational lightcurve of Fatme was obtained from 5 nights of photometric observations by Tom Polakis at the Command Module Observatory  in Arizona. Lightcurve analysis gave a rotation period of  hours with a brightness variation of  magnitude. The result supersedes previously reported period determinations of  hours with an amplitude of  magnitude by Robert Stephens at the Santana Observatory , California, in May 2001,  hours with an amplitude of  magnitude (tentative) by French amateur astronomer Laurent Bernasconi in December 2004,  hours with an amplitude of  magnitude (tentative) by French amateur astronomer René Roy in May 2012, and  hours with an amplitude of  magnitude by the Spanish group of asteroid observers, OBAS, in January 2016.

Diameter and albedo 

The Collaborative Asteroid Lightcurve Link derives an albedo of 0.0361 and a diameter of 88.11 kilometers based on an absolute magnitude of 9.5.

References

External links 
 Lightcurve Database Query (LCDB), at www.minorplanet.info
 Dictionary of Minor Planet Names, Google books
 Asteroids and comets rotation curves, CdR – Geneva Observatory, Raoul Behrend
 Discovery Circumstances: Numbered Minor Planets (1)-(5000) – Minor Planet Center
 
 

000866
Discoveries by Max Wolf
Named minor planets
000866
19170225